Dendropoma squamiferum is a species of irregularly coiled sea snails, marine gastropod molluscs in the family Vermetidae, the worm snails.

References

 Powell A. W. B., New Zealand Mollusca, William Collins Publishers Ltd, Auckland, New Zealand 1979 

Vermetidae
Gastropods of New Zealand
Gastropods described in 1967